An endopeptidase inhibitor is a drug that inhibits one or more endopeptidase enzymes. Endopeptidases are one of two types of proteases (enzymes that break down proteins and peptides), the other being exopeptidases. Endopeptidases cleave peptide bonds of non-terminal amino acids (that is, they cut proteins/peptides into two chains), whereas exopeptidases break terminal bonds, resulting in the release of a single amino acid or dipeptide from the peptide chain.

Examples of endopeptidase inhibitors
Some examples of endopeptidase inhibitors include the following:

 Neprilysin inhibitors
 Selective neprilysin inhibitors
 Candoxatril - prodrug to candoxatrilat
 Candoxatrilat - active metabolite of candoxatril
 Dexecadotril (retorphan) - (R)-enantiomer of racecadotril; prodrug to (R)-thiorphan
 Ecadotril (sinorphan) - (S)-enantiomer of racecadotril; prodrug to (S)-thiorphan
 Racecadotril (acetorphan) - racemic form of dexecadotril and ecadotril; prodrug to thiorphan
 Sacubitril - prodrug to sacubitrilat
 Sacubitrilat - active metabolite of sacubitril
 Thiorphan - active metabolite of racecadotril
 UK-414,495
 Non-selective neprilysin inhibitors
 Aladotril - also inhibits angiotensin converting enzyme (ACE) (an exopeptidase)
 Alatriopril - also inhibits ACE
 Daglutril - also inhibits endothelin converting enzyme (ECE) (an exopeptidase)
 Fasidotril - also inhibits ACE
 Gemopatrilat - also inhibits ACE
 Ilepatril - also inhibits ACE
 Ketalorphan - also inhibits APN, ACE, and dipeptidyl-peptidase 3 (DPP-3) (an exopeptidase)
 Omapatrilat - also inhibits ACE
 Phosphoramidon - inhibitor of neprilysin and thermolysin; also inhibits ECE
 RB-101 - also inhibits aminopeptidase N (APN) (an exopeptidase)
 Sampatrilat
 Spinorphan - also inhibits APN, ACE, and DPP-3
 Tynorphin - also inhibits APN, ACE, and DPP-3
 Trypsin inhibitors/others
 Aloxistatin - inhibitor of cysteine proteases
 Camostat - inhibitor of trypsin and various other proteases
 Ecallantide - kallikrein inhibitor
 Leupeptin - non-selective inhibitor of cysteine, serine, and threonine proteases
 Nafamostat - inhibitor of trypsin, tryptase, and various other serine proteases
 Pacifastins - trypsin and chymotrypsin inhibitor
 Patamostat - trypsin inhibitor
 Pepstatin - inhibitor of renin and various aspartyl proteases
 Sepimostat - inhibitor of serine proteases
 Sivelestat - inhibitor of neutrophil elastase
 Talopeptin - inhibitor of thermolysin and other metalloproteases
 Ulinastatin - inhibitor of trypsin and various other proteases
 Upamostat - serine protease inhibitor
 Renin inhibitors
 Aliskiren
 Ciprokiren
 Ditekiren
 Enalkiren
 Pepstatin
 Remikiren
 Terlakiren
 Zankiren

See also
 Exopeptidase inhibitor
 Enkephalinase inhibitor

References

Protease inhibitors